Jenson may refer to:

 Jenson (name), people with the surname or given name. 
 Adobe Jenson, a typeface based on the work of printer Nicolas Jenson

See also
 Jens (disambiguation)
 Jensen (disambiguation)